Tabibar Rahman Sarder (1 May 1932 – 3 April 2010) was a Bangladesh Awami League politician. He was elected a member of parliament in 1973 from Jessore-5. He was elected to member of parliament from Jessore-1 in 1991 and June 1996.

Birth and early life 
Tabibar Rahman Sarder was born 1 May 1932 in Jessore District.

Career 
Tabibar Rahman Sarder was elected a member of parliament in 1973 from Jessore-5. He was elected to member of parliament from Jessore-1 in 1991 and June 1996.

Death 
Tabibar Rahman Sarder died on 3 April 2010.

See also 
 Jatiya Sangsad

References

External links 
 List of 1st Parliament Members -Jatiya Sangsad (In Bangla)
 List of 5th Parliament Members -Jatiya Sangsad (In Bangla)
List of 7th Parliament Members -Jatiya Sangsad (In Bangla)

1932 births
2010 deaths
People from Jessore District
1st Jatiya Sangsad members
5th Jatiya Sangsad members
Awami League politicians
7th Jatiya Sangsad members